{{DISPLAYTITLE:NAD+ glycohydrolase}}

In enzymology, a NAD+ glycohydrolase is an enzyme that catalyzes the chemical reaction

NAD+ + H2O  ADP-ribose + nicotinamide

Thus, the two substrates of this enzyme are NAD+ and H2O, whereas its two products are ADP-ribose and nicotinamide. Unlike ADP-ribosyl cyclase/cyclic ADP-ribose hydrolase (EC 3.2.2.6), which catalyzes the same reaction, this reaction does not proceed through a cyclic ADP-ribose.

This enzyme belongs to the family of hydrolases, specifically those glycosylases that hydrolyse N-glycosyl compounds. The systematic name of this enzyme class is NAD+ glycohydrolase. Other names in common use include NAD+ nucleosidase, NADase, DPNase, DPN hydrolase, NAD hydrolase, diphosphopyridine nucleosidase, nicotinamide adenine dinucleotide nucleosidase, NAD glycohydrolase, NAD nucleosidase, and nicotinamide adenine dinucleotide glycohydrolase.  This enzyme participates in nicotinate and nicotinamide metabolism and calcium signaling pathway. Calcium metabolism involves the regulation of the levels of calcium in the body. The role this calcium plays also includes providing enough calcium for bone mineralization. It serves as the basis for the structure and rigidity of bones. Calcium metabolism can lead to a variety of diseases which can involve renal function. High concentrations of calcium can lead to cell death or apoptosis.

References 

 Putney, J. W. P. (2019). Calcium Metabolism. Access Science. https://www.accessscience.com/content/calcium-metabolism/103100

Further reading 

 
 
 
 
 

EC 3.2.2
NADH-dependent enzymes
Enzymes of known structure